Lucas Ngonda is an Angolan politician.

Ngonda has led one of two factions on the National Liberation Front of Angola (FNLA) since the division emerged in February 1999. He previously served as the FNLA spokesman.

References

Angolan military personnel
People of the Angolan Civil War
Living people
National Liberation Front of Angola politicians
20th-century Angolan people
21st-century Angolan people
Year of birth missing (living people)